Sengele is a Bantu language of the Democratic Republic of the Congo.

References

Bangi-Ntomba languages
Languages of the Democratic Republic of the Congo